Lillie: F-65 is the eighth studio album by American doom metal band Saint Vitus, released on April 27, 2012 (May 22, 2012 in the United States). This is the first Saint Vitus studio album since Die Healing (1995) and the only one to feature Scott "Wino" Weinrich on vocals in 22 years, since V (1990). It also marks their first album with Henry Vasquez on drums, and their final release with bassist Mark Adams, who left the band in 2016 due to Parkinson's disease.

In an interview, Wino explained the album title name was in reference to a powerful downer back in the day and that Dave Chandler "really had a thing for his downers."

Single and video
On March 23, 2012, a 7" single of "Blessed Night" was released (coupled with "Look Behind You", which was recorded live in December 2010 at Z7 in Pratteln, Switzerland). The single was limited to 1,000 hand-numbered copies.

On April 3, 2012, Saint Vitus released a video for the song "Let Them Fall", which was produced and directed by Michael Panduro of Siegfred Productions for SCION A/V.

Track listing

Personnel
Saint Vitus
Scott "Wino" Weinrich - vocals, guitar on "Vertigo"
Dave Chandler - guitar
Mark Adams - bass
Henry Vasquez - drums

Production
Tony Reed - producer, engineer, mixing and mastering

References

Saint Vitus (band) albums
2012 albums
Season of Mist albums